Spitidiscus is a genus of ammonites placed in the family Holcodiscidae.

Species 
List of species within Spitidiscus:
 Spitidiscus hugii
 Spitidiscus kilapiae Rawson and Aguirre-Urreta, 2012 - Argentina
 Spitidiscus oregonensis Imlay, 1960 - Oregon
 Spitidiscus riccardii Leanza, and Wiedmann, 1992 - Argentina
 Spitidiscus rotulia - England
 Spitidiscus simitiensis Haas, 1960 - Colombia
 Spitidiscus vandeckii (d'Orbigny, 1847)

Description 
Member species have a rather evolute shell in which the whorl section is more or less circular,  venter broadly rounded and dorsum fairly deeply impressed. Close, fine low, single or rarely branching ribs are interspersed by frequent straight or slightly sinuous, moderately deep but wide constrictions. The type species S. rotulia is from the Hauterivian of England.

Biostratigraphic significance 
The first appearance of the species Spitidiscus hugii or Spitidiscus vandeckii are proposed to be the marker for the beginning of the Barremian.

Distribution 
Spitidiscus has been found in:
 Agrio Formation, Argentina
 Magdalena Valley, Simití and Cáqueza, Colombia
 Kaliste Formation, Czech Republic
 France
 Gagra, Georgia, Caucasus
 Maiolica Formation, Italy
 Subbetics, Spain
 Foggy Creek, Oregon
 Bulgaria
 Portugal
 Russia
 Morocco
 Mexico

References

Bibliography 
 
 
 W.J. Arkell et al., (1957). Mesozoic Ammonoidea in  Treatise on Invertebrate Paleontology, Part L, Ammonoidea. Geological Society of America and Univ Kansas Press.

Desmoceratoidea
Ammonitida genera
Index fossils
Cretaceous ammonites
Barremian life
Hauterivian life
Ammonites of Europe
Fossils of the Czech Republic
Cretaceous France
Fossils of France
Fossils of Georgia (country)
Cretaceous Italy
Fossils of Italy
Cretaceous Spain
Fossils of Spain
Ammonites of North America
Paleontology in Oregon
Fossils of the United States
Ammonites of South America
Cretaceous Argentina
Fossils of Argentina
Cretaceous Colombia
Fossils of Colombia
Fossil taxa described in 1910